"I Don't Wanna Be a Star" is a song by the Italian band Corona, released in November 1995 as the fourth and last single from their debut album, The Rhythm of the Night. It was a club hit in many European countries, but unlike the previous Corona singles, it had disco sonorities. The song was unable to eclipse the success of "The Rhythm of the Night" or "Baby Baby", but achieved moderate success in Europe. It peaked at number-one in both Italy and Spain, number five in Hungary and number six in Finland. In the UK and on the Eurochart Hot 100, it peaked within the Top 30. It is Corona's last major hit to date.

Critical reception
AllMusic editor Jose F. Promis described the song as "irresistible", picking it as one of the standout tracks on The Rhythm of the Night album. James Masterton for Dotmusic commented, "All hail the return of the synth drum. Ever since Corona first hit the dizzy heights of Number 2 with Rhythm Of The Night at the end of 1994 they have proved that they are far from one-hit wonders but instead are one of the finest pop acts around." He added that it is "possibly their best single yet", and "such a perfect pastiche of a 1970s disco track that it could almost be a reissue. It isn't, instead being a completely up to date track but sounding every inch a classic already - right down to the cheesy synth drum which has surely not been heard since the days of Kelly Marie and Feels Like I'm In Love." A reviewer from Music Week rated it three out of five, writing, "A Seventies version featuring Chic-like string flourishes, handclaps and syn-drums, which should go down a storm in the gay clubs." Pop Rescue deemed it as "catchy", noting the single version as "laden with a disco sound", while the album version is not.

Chart performance
"I Don't Wanna Be a Star" was a major hit in several countries, although it didn't reach as high as the band's three first singles. It peaked at number-one in Spain and Italy, and reached the Top 10 also in Finland and Hungary. Additionally, the single was a Top 20 hit in France, Iceland and Scotland. In the UK, it went to number 22 on December 17, 1995, in its first week on the UK Singles Chart. But on the RM On A Pop Tip Club Chart, it reached number-one. On the Eurochart Hot 100, it also reached the Top 30, peaking at number 23 in January 1996. Outside Europe, the song made it to number six on the RPM Dance chart in Canada, number 23 in Israel and number 109 in Australia.

Music video
The music video for "I Don't Wanna Be a Star" was shot in Rome, Italy. Many famous places from the city can be seen in the video, like Colosseum, Harry's Bar, and Via Veneto. Many scenes are also showing Corona's frontwoman Olga de Souza singing in front of the Trevi Fountain. Other scenes show her in a restaurant where she poses for photographs or sitting in a taxi while paparazzi are following her. The video is made in a 70s-style, and throughout the video, de Souza wears many different costumes and wigs in different colors. It was later published on YouTube in September 2014. The video has amassed more than 957,000 views as of October 2021.

Track listings

CD single
 "I Don't Wanna Be a Star" (70's Radio Edit) — 4:33
 "I Don't Wanna Be a Star" (Lee Marrow E.U.R.O. Radio Edit) — 3:58

CD maxi
 "I Don't Wanna Be a Star" (Lee Marrow E.U.R.O. Radio Edit) — 3:58
 "I Don't Wanna Be a Star" (Lee Marrow 70's Radio Edit) — 4:33
 "I Don't Wanna Be a Star" (Lee Marrow Club Mix) — 5:32
 "I Don't Wanna Be a Star" (Lee Marrow Eurobeat Mix) — 6:51
 "I Don't Wanna Be a Star" (Lee Marrow & the Magnificent 70's Mix) — 6:27
 "I Don't Wanna Be a Star" (Lee Marrow Original Long Mix) — 4:57
 "I Don't Wanna Be a Star" (UK hardcor-ona Dub) — 5:37
 "I Don't Wanna Be a Star" (a Cappella) — 3:58

12" maxi

A-side :
 "I Don't Wanna Be a Star" (Lee Marrow Eurobeat Mix) — 6:51
 "I Don't Wanna Be a Star" (Lee Marrow Club Mix) — 5:32
 "I Don't Wanna Be A Star" (Lee Marrow E.U.R.O. Radio Edit) — 3:58
 "I Don't Wanna Be a Star" (a Cappella) — 3:58

B-side :
 "I Don't Wanna Be a Star" (Lee Marrow & the Magnificent 70's Mix) — 6:27
 "I Don't Wanna Be a Star" (Lee Marrow Original Long Mix) — 4:57
 "I Don't Wanna Be a Star" (Lee Marrow 70's Radio Edit) — 4:33
 "I Don't Wanna Be a Star" (UK hardcor-ona Dub) — 5:37

7" maxi

A-side :
 "I Don't Wanna Be a Star (Lee Marrow & the Magnificent 70's Mix) — 6:27
B-side :
 "I Don't Wanna Be a Star" (Lee Marrow Eurobeat Mix) — 6:51

Personnel
 Created, arranged and produced by Checco and Soul Train for a Lee Marrow production
 Engineered by Francesco Alberti at Casablanca Recordings (Italy), Graphic Art Sunrise (Italy)
 'UK Hardcor-Ona Dub' :
 Remix and additional production by Gino Olivieri and Ivan Palvin for Premier Musik Productions Inc.
 Assisted by Marco Vani
 Mix engineered by Bruno Ruffolo at In-Da-Mix Studio, Montreal (Canada)
 Re-organised, replayed and reconstructed by DJ Moisha and Mixmaster Irving

Charts

Weekly charts

Year-end charts

References

1995 singles
1996 singles
Corona (band) songs
Eurodance songs
Electronic songs
Techno songs
1995 songs
Number-one singles in Italy
Number-one singles in Spain